Della may refer to:

 Della (name), including a list of people with the name
 Della (film), a 1964 television pilot film starring Joan Crawford
 Della (TV series), starring Della Reese
 Della (album)
 Della, Ethiopia, a town in Ethiopia

See also
 Dela (disambiguation)
 Della Falls